These quarterbacks have started at least one game for the Washington Commanders of the National Football League, formerly known as the Boston Braves (1932), Boston Redskins (1933–1936), Washington Redskins (1937–2019), and Washington Football Team (2020–2021). Only two starting quarterbacks for Washington have been inducted into the Pro Football Hall of Fame: Sammy Baugh (–) and Sonny Jurgensen (–).

Regular season

Postseason

Franchise passing records

See also

 Lists of NFL starting quarterbacks

References

 

 
Washington Commanders
quarterbacks